William Elliot (12 March 1766 – 26 October 1818) was an Irish politician who sat in the Irish House of Commons before its abolition. After the Act of Union he sat as a Whig in the House of Commons of the United Kingdom of Great Britain and Ireland.

Elliot was elected to the Irish House of Commons in 1796 as a Member of Parliament for St Canice. At the 1798 election he was returned for both Carlow Borough and for St Canice, but chose to continue to sit for St Canice. He held that seat until the Parliament of Ireland was abolished at the end of 1800 by the Act of Union, when he did not initially have a seat in the new Parliament of the United Kingdom.

However, he was elected at an unopposed by-election
in March 1801 as MP for Portarlington, and held that seat until the 1802 general election, when he was returned to the House of Commons of the United Kingdom for the English borough of Peterborough. He held that seat until his death in October 1818, aged 52.

He was sworn as a Privy Councillor in March 1806, in Dublin Castle,
and appointed on 28 March as  Chief Secretary for Ireland in the Ministry of All the Talents. He held that post until 1807.

References

External links 
 

1766 births
1818 deaths
Irish MPs 1790–1797
Irish MPs 1798–1800
Whig (British political party) MPs for English constituencies
Members of the Parliament of the United Kingdom for Portarlington
UK MPs 1801–1802
Whig (British political party) MPs for Irish constituencies
UK MPs 1802–1806
UK MPs 1806–1807
UK MPs 1807–1812
UK MPs 1812–1818
UK MPs 1818–1820
Members of the Privy Council of Ireland
Commissioners of the Treasury for Ireland
Chief Secretaries for Ireland
Members of the Parliament of Ireland (pre-1801) for County Kilkenny constituencies
Members of the Parliament of Ireland (pre-1801) for County Carlow constituencies